The 1965 Auckland City mayoral election was part of the New Zealand local elections held that same year. In 1965, elections were held for the Mayor of Auckland plus other local government positions including twenty-one city councillors. The polling was conducted using the standard first-past-the-post electoral method.

Background
Incumbent two-term Mayor Dove-Myer Robinson was defeated by Roy McElroy of the Citizens & Ratepayers ticket. Robinson's position had been worsened by the entry of Labour Party councillor George Forsyth to the race which allowed McElroy to win on a split vote.

Mayoralty results

Councillor results

References

Notes

Mayoral elections in Auckland
1965 elections in New Zealand
Politics of the Auckland Region
1960s in Auckland
October 1965 events in New Zealand